Anja Pyritz (born 31 August 1970 in Kühlungsborn) is a German rower.

References
 
 

1970 births
Living people
German female rowers
Rowers at the 1996 Summer Olympics
Rowers at the 2004 Summer Olympics
World Rowing Championships medalists for Germany
People from Rostock (district)
Olympic rowers of Germany
20th-century German women
21st-century German women